Prudianka is an urban-type settlement in Kharkiv Raion of Kharkiv Oblast in Ukraine. It is located on the left bank of the Lopan, in the drainage basin of the Don. Prudianka belongs to Derhachi urban hromada, one of the hromadas of Ukraine. Population: 

Until 18 July 2020, Prudianka belonged to Derhachi Raion. The raion was abolished in July 2020 as part of the administrative reform of Ukraine, which reduced the number of raions of Kharkiv Oblast to seven. The area of Derhachi Raion was merged into Kharkiv Raion.

Economy

Transportation
Prudianka railway station is on the railway connecting Kharkiv and Belgorod. There is local passenger traffic between Kharkiv and Kozacha Lopan.

The settlement has road access to Highway M20 which connects Kharkiv with the Russian border and continues across the border to Belgorod.

References

Urban-type settlements in Kharkiv Raion